There are over 20,000 Grade II* listed buildings in England. This article comprises a list of these buildings in the county of Cornwall.

List of buildings

|}

See also

Grade I listed buildings in Cornwall
Grade II* listed buildings in Cornwall
Grade II* listed buildings in Cornwall (A–G)
Grade II* listed buildings in Cornwall (Q–Z)

Notes

External links

Grade II* listed buildings in Cornwall
 
Lists of Grade II* listed buildings in Cornwall